The subfamily Crabroninae (digger wasps) is the most diverse group in the wasp family Crabronidae, containing over 110 genera and 4,800 described species. The subfamily consists of solitary, predatory wasps. The adult females of many groups dig tunnels in the ground for nesting, but others use different techniques, including the construction of tube-like mud nests (e.g., Trypoxylon politum).

As with all other sphecoid wasps, the larvae are carnivorous; females hunt for prey on which to lay their eggs, supplying the larvae with paralyzed, living prey when they emerge.

References 

Crabronidae
Apocrita subfamilies